Salicornia europaea, known as marsh samphire, common glasswort or just glasswort, is a halophytic annual dicot flowering plant in the family Amaranthaceae. Glasswort is a succulent herb also known as ‘Pickle weed’ or ‘Marsh samphire’. As a succulent, it has high water content, which accounts for its slightly translucent look and gives it the descriptive name “glasswort.” To some people, it is known as “chicken toe” because of its shape. To others, it is called “saltwort.” It grows in various zones of intertidal salt marshes, on beaches, and among mangroves.

Description
Glasswort plants are relatively small and have jointed, bright green stems. During the fall, these plants turn red or purple. Their leaves are small and scale like, and they produce fleshy fruits that contain a single seed.

Like most members of the subfamily Salicornioideae, Salicornia species use the C3 carbon fixation pathway to take in carbon dioxide from the surrounding atmosphere.

Uses
The ashes of glasswort and saltwort plants (barilla) and of kelp were long used as a source of soda ash (mainly sodium carbonate) for glassmaking and soapmaking.
The introduction of the Leblanc process for the industrial production of soda ash in the first half of the 19th century superseded the use of plant sources.

Culinary use
Salicornia europaea is edible, either cooked or raw. In the UK, it is one of several plants known as samphire (see also rock samphire); the term samphire is believed to be a corruption of the French name, herbe de Saint-Pierre, which means "St. Peter's herb".

Samphire is usually cooked, then coated in butter or olive oil. Due to its high salt content, it must be cooked without any salt added, in plenty of water. After cooking, it resembles seaweed in colour, and the flavour and texture are like young spinach stems, asparagus, or artichoke. Samphire is often used as a suitably maritime accompaniment to fish or seafood.

Pharmacological research
In South Korea, Phyto Corporation has developed a technology of extracting low-sodium salt from Salicornia europaea, a salt-accumulating plant. The company claims the naturally-derived plant salt is effective in treating high blood pressure and fatty liver disease by reducing sodium intake. The company has also developed a desalted Salicornia powder containing antioxidative and antithrombus polyphenols, claimed to be effective in treating obesity and arteriosclerosis, as well as providing a means to help resolve global food shortages.

Environmental uses
Salicornia europaea is a new candidate plant species for using in effective phytoremediation of cadmium-contaminated saline soils

Growing Salicornia
Salicornia prefers a light, sandy soil (or a well-drained soil) and a sunny position. Samphire can be planted out once the danger of frosts is past. Salicornia grow best in 200 mM NaCl.

In the Northern Hemisphere, the harvesting of samphire shoots takes place from June to August. After that time shoots will become woody. Treat samphire as a slow-growing cut-and-come-again crop and leave a month between each cut.

Commercial farming of samphire in specially salted fields takes place in the UK, Israel, and Germany. In the UK, marsh samphire is now grown hydroponically for supply all year round and to reduce the pressure on wild populations from over-harvest.

References

europaea
Barilla plants
Edible plants
Salt marsh plants
Plants described in 1753
Succulent plants
Taxa named by Carl Linnaeus